Margalit "Margol" Tzan'ani (born December 19, 1948) is an Israeli singer and television personality. Tzan'ani is famous for her repertoire of Israeli oriental music style with soul influences, as well as jazz, blues, rock, and pop.

Biography 
Tzan'ani was born in Aden, to a religious Jewish family originally from Sana'a, Yemen. When she was one year old, the family immigrated to Israel with her, and resided in Netanya city. She was the eldest of seven children. Her father, Shalom, was a diamond industry worker, and her mother, Lola, was a housewife. She married Mordi Lavi in 1977 and has one son, Asaf. She divorced in 1985. For many years she performed at weddings and private events. She also worked at a stall in the Jaffa flea market and as a salesgirl at Hamashbir Latzarchan department store. Today she lives in Azor, a village on the outskirts of Tel Aviv.

Musical career
Tzan'ani started her career at the age of 19 in the Israeli production of Hair, where she performed alongside Svika Pick and Tzedi Tzarfati. For the audition, she sang "Rak al atzmi lesaper yadati", based on a poem by the poet Rachel.

She was an extra in the movie Kazablan, released in 1973. That year, she also participated in the musical Lili Gam (Lili Too) with Yizhar Cohen and Roman Sharon. Tzan'ani worked between the years 1970 and 1980 in a successful wedding band called "Shokolada". In 1985 she took part in the song "Rotzim Shalom" ("We Want Peace"), an Israeli version of the song "We Are the World". Tzan'ani's breakthrough was in 1986, when she appeared on Siba LiMesiba (A Reason for a Party) a Friday night television show hosted by Rivka Michaeli on IBA. She sang "Na'ari Shuva Elay" ("My Boy, Come Back to Me"), one of her biggest hits.

Her first album, also called Na'ari Shuva Elay, was released in 1986, with the help of Yehuda Keysar and musical adapter Haim Hadad. Keysar and Hadad paid for the master recording and sold it to Nissim Ben-Haim, her first producer. She also participated in the Israeli Children's Song Festival of that year with "Asaf Sheli" ("My Asaf").

In 1987, Tzan'ani released her second album, Shmor Oti (Keep Me). The song "Shmor Oti" was a big hit.

In 1988, Tzan'ani released her third album, Ahava Avuda (Lost Love).

In 1989, Tzan'ani released the album Menta (Mint), her first collaboration with Jaroslav Jakubovic, who adapted it in jazz style and composed some of the songs. The album included hits like "Od Yehiye Li" ("I'll Have") and "Menta". That same year, she joined the cast of the movie Al Hapanim, together with Rivka Michaeli and Nuli Omer and appeared in the Fesitgal children's song show with the song "Nesikhot Shkhorot" (Black Princesses) which came in third.

In 1990, her album Homot Hemar (Clay Barriers) was released, again produced by Jakubovic, and for the first time included songs Margol wrote. The song "Homot Hemar" is one of her biggest hits. That year, she participated in Festigal again, this time with the song "Gan Eden" (Heaven) that came in fifth.

In 1991, during the Gulf War, Tzan'ani released her fifth album Pgisha (A Date). The song "Pgisha" was a big hit, is still one of her biggest hits. Tzan'ani performed with Shlomo Gronich at the Arad Festival of 1992. Together they recorded the song "Bama'agal" (In the Circle) for Dan Shilon's prime time Channel 2 show Beshidur Hai (Live Broadcast).

In 1993, Tzan'ani released her sixth album Margol (her stage name). The song "Margol" was written about her.

In 1995, she took part in the song "Kutonet Pasim" (Coat of Many Colors) record in Israel Defense Forces Radio, as part of an Immigrant Absorption Minister of Israel's information campaign. That year, she released another album, Eretz Esh Eretz Yam (Fire Land, Sea Land).

In 1997, she released another album called Hofshi (Free), which included the songs "Hofshi", "Alhembera Coffee" and "Maybe". In 1998, she recorded a cover version of the Israeli classic song "Pizmon Ha'Agada" (The Legend's Chorus) for the album Avoda Ivrit, on which famous Israeli musicians recorded cover versions to Israeli classics in honor of 50 years of Israel's independence. She also made a cover version of "Like Drunk" by Zohar Argov for the album Friends Singing Zohar in his memory.

In 2003, Tzan'ani released the album Le'Olam (Forever), most of the songs on which she wrote.

In 2005, she released the album Galeh Li (Tell Me) that included the super-hit "Az Ma?!" (So What?!). Most of this album's songs were written by her son, Asaf Lavi Tzan'ani.

In 2006, she released her album Hameytav. That summer she went to America with Yardena Arazi, Ilanit, Ruti Navon. and Shlomit Aharon for a tour of Jewish communities.

In 2009, Tzan'ani released her album Davka Hayom (Today of All Days). The song "Etz Yarok MiPlastic" ("Plastic Tree") was a super-hit. It was the most played song on Israeli radio stations that year.

In 2010, Tzan'ani released her super-hit "Halayla" ("Tonight"), which was used as a soundtrack intro for the TV show "Onat HaHatunot 2" (Wedding Season 2). The song released as a single and not a part of an album, since she didn't release an album until later.

In 2012, Tzan'ani recorded new versions of her greatest hits "Na'ari Shuva Elay 2012", "Menta 2012", "Od Ihye Li 2012", "Homot Hemar 2012" and "Pgisha 2012".

In 2014, Tzan'ani started a concert tour with the singer Zehava Ben. Later on that same year, she joined Arisa, a company that produces Mizrahi-themed parties at gay and gay-friendly clubs, for the production of the video of her protest single Po ze lo Eropa (It Ain't Europe Here), written and composed by Doron Medalie. Arisa's lead dancer, drag queen Uriel Yekutiel, performs in the song's video.

On January 18, 2015 Tzanani released "Od Yom" ("Another Day"), a duet with Eti Levi, and that same year she began hosting a radio show on Kol HaMedina named "Po ze lo Eropa!" with broadcaster Hani Zubida.

On June 28, 2016 Tzan'ani released the song "Rachok miKan ("Far Away"), written and composed by her son, Assaf Lavi.

Musical influences
In an interview with Haaretz newspaper, Tzan'ani cited Ella Fitzgerald, Tina Turner, and Aretha Franklin as major influences.

Television career
In 1993, Tzan'ani hosted her own talk show, Margol, on Channel 2.

In 2001, she hosted the cooking show BaMitbakh im Margol (In the Kitchen With Margol) on the Briza Channel and took part in the panel of a talk show on the same channel. Tsan'ani also hosted radio shows and took part in the comic drama series Pick Up on Channel Ten as the mother of Gili. She has been parodied on the comedy show Eretz Nehederet.

In 2006, she was chosen to be a judge in Kokhav Nolad, the Israeli version of American Idol. She  continued in this capacity for four seasons.

Other works
In 2007, Tzan'ani voiced Darlin' in the Hebrew dub of the animated film Everyone's Hero.

Allegations of extortion
On August 16, 2011 Israeli Police arrested Tzan'ani and her son, Asaf Tzan'ani, during a raid on their homes. She was charged with extortion and blackmail against her manager, Assaf Atedgi. The charges against her son, Asaf, were dropped. Tzan'ani denied the charges against her. The case was covered widely by the Israeli media and at the same time, the media was criticized for portraying successful Mizrahi recording artists as engaged in illegal activities.  Tzan'ani was tried, found guilty and sentenced to 6 months in prison, which she served performing community service. She later continued her music career.

Discography 
 1986 – Na'Ari Shuva Elay
 1987 – Shmor Oti
 1988 – Ahava Avuda
 1989 – Menta
 1990 – Homot Hemar
 1991 – Pgisha
 1992 – Greatest Hits 1
 1993 – Margol
 1995 – Erez Esh Eretz Yam
 1997 – Hofshi
 2003 – LeOlam
 2005 – Gale Li
 2006 – Gold
 2009 – Davka Hayom

References

External links 
  

1948 births
Living people
Jewish Israeli musicians
Jewish women singers
Israeli people of Yemeni-Jewish descent
People from Netanya
Jewish jazz musicians
20th-century Israeli women singers
21st-century Israeli women singers